The DF11G (Chinese: 东风11G, nickname: 猪头) is a twin unit semi-high-speed diesel locomotive used on the People's Republic of China's national railway system. This locomotive was built by Qishuyan Locomotive and Rolling Stock Works. DF11G Diesel Locomotive is a twelve shaft fixing reconnection passenger diesel locomotive which based on two six-axle locomotives connected.

The DF11G has two batches, varying in the voltage of head-end power. In the first batch, HEP is supplied as three-phase AC at 380 V, while the second batch supports DC 600 V HEP.

Gallery

See also 
 List of locomotives in China
 China Railways DF11
 China Railways DF11Z

References

External links 
 locomotive description from builder (CSR)
 DF11G型内燃机车 Trainnets.com.

DF11G
Co-Co+Co-Co locomotives
Railway locomotives introduced in 2003
Standard gauge locomotives of China
Qishuyan locomotives